Homestead Senior High School is a public high school located at 2351 SE 12 Avenue in Homestead, Florida.  It is part of the Miami-Dade County Public Schools district. Its principal is John A. Galardi

Homestead is one of two high schools serving a community that includes most of Homestead, Florida City and Leisure City. The high school offers magnet programs, including the Academy of International Business, the Academy of Aviation/Aerospace, Academy of Travel and Tourism, an Environmental Horticulture Science and Services program, and a Health Science Education program (one of only three such programs in the state that lead to a Certification in Practical Nursing).

History
In 1992 Homestead High School was severely damaged by Hurricane Andrew, forcing the school to delay opening for the 1992–1993 school year by two weeks.  Most of the families in the surrounding community left after the hurricane, but a few stayed, living in tents, mobile homes, or shared accommodation in other parts of the county. Those students still living in the area were forced to attend other schools in the district, which were at times ten to fifteen miles away.

The damage done to Homestead High School was not significant enough for it to be demolished. Within a year of the disaster, Homestead High School and nearby South Dade High School (also damaged by Andrew) opened their doors to the still devastated areas welcoming students whose families had not left the area. Since the hurricane, the racial, ethnic, and socioeconomic mix of the community and school has changed, mainly due to the building of low income housing in the areas where middle-class homes were once located.

Demographics
Homestead High School is 52% Hispanic, 43% Black, 4% White, and 1% Asian.

Notable alumni

Jose Baez, Defense attorney
Micheal Barrow, NFL linebacker, Houston Oilers, Carolina Panthers, New York Giants
John Brown, NFL wide receiver
James Burgess, NFL linebacker
James Burgess Jr., NFL linebacker
Eric Foster, NFL defensive tackle
Herbert Goodman, NFL running back and former mixed martial artist
Charles Lee, NFL wide receiver
Bobby McCray, NFL defensive end
Willie Middlebrooks, NFL & CFL cornerback 
Bob Pifferini, NFL linebacker
Rashad Smith, NFL linebacker
Herb Waters, NFL & CFL cornerback
Anthony Wint, NFL & CFL linebacker

See also
Education in the United States

References

External links
Homestead Senior High School

Educational institutions established in 1979
Miami-Dade County Public Schools high schools
Homestead, Florida
1979 establishments in Florida